James Cropper may refer to:

James Cropper (abolitionist) (1773–1840), English businessman in Liverpool and philanthropist
James Cropper (politician) (1823–1900), British politician
James Cropper (priest) (1862–1938), British Anglican clergyman
Sir James Cropper (businessman) (born 1938), British paper manufacturer and Lord-Lieutenant of Cumbria
James Cropper plc, English papermaking company